G-Man is the third studio album by Rake., released in 1996 by Squealer.

Track listing

Personnel 
Adapted from the G-Man liner notes.
Rake.
Jim Ayre – electric guitar, vocals
Bill Kellum – bass guitar
Carl Moller – drums, saxophone

Release history

References

External links 
 G-Man at Discogs (list of releases)

1996 albums
Rake (band) albums